New Hampshire state elections in 2018 were held on Tuesday, November 6, 2018, with the primary elections being held on June 5, 2018. Voters elected 2 members to the United States House of Representatives, the Governor of New Hampshire, all five members to the Executive Council, all 24 members to the New Hampshire Senate, and all 400 members to the New Hampshire House of Representatives, among other local elected offices.

Overview

Turnout

Primary Election 

The Primary election was held on Tuesday, June 5, 2018.
Turnout by county:

General Election 

The General election was held on Tuesday, November 6, 2018.
Turnout by county:

United States Congress

Senate 
New Hampshire held no election for the United States Senate in 2018, as the state is not represented in the Senate by a seat of Class 2.

House of Representatives 

New Hampshire's two seats in the United States House of Representatives were up for election. Both seats were retained by the Democratic Party.

State's constitutional offices

Governor 

Incumbent Republican Chris Sununu was reelected against Democratic nominee Molly Kelly.

Executive council 

All 5 seats of the New Hampshire Executive Council were up for election. Democrats were able to gain one seat and thus achieved a 3-2 majority.

State Legislature

State Senate 

All 24 seats of the New Hampshire Senate were up for election. Democrats achieved a 14-10 majority.

State House of Representatives 

All 400 seats of the New Hampshire House of Representatives were up for election. Democrats achieved a 234-166 majority.

References

 
New Hampshire